Henry Alfred John Crane (12 September 1869 – 12 May 1921) was an Australian rules footballer who played with Carlton in the Victorian Football League (VFL).

Notes

External links 
		
Henry Crane's profile at Blueseum

1869 births
1921 deaths
Australian rules footballers from Ballarat
Carlton Football Club players